Trigonoptera tesselata is a species of beetle in the family Cerambycidae. It was described by Francis Polkinghorne Pascoe in 1867, originally under the genus Arsysia.

References

Tmesisternini
Beetles described in 1867